The El Copé giant salamander (Bolitoglossa copia) is a species of salamander in the family Plethodontidae.
It is endemic to Panama.
Its natural habitat is subtropical or tropical moist montane forests.

References

Bolitoglossa
Endemic fauna of Panama
Taxonomy articles created by Polbot
Amphibians described in 2005